E.S.P. (Erick Sermon's Perception) is the seventh solo studio album by American rapper and producer Erick Sermon. It was released on September 25, 2015 via Def Squad Records/Caroline Records.

Track listing 

Sample credits

 "The Sermon" contains elements from "New Beginning" by Dexter Wansel 
 "Daydreamer" contains elements from "You're a Customer" by EPMD 
 "Angry" contains elements from "The Cuckoo" by Tom Rush 
 "Make Room" contains elements from "It's All About the Benjamins" by Puff Daddy, Lil' Kim, The Lox & Notorious B.I.G. 
 "Serious" contains elements from "Sunny Monday" by Booker T. & the M.G.'s, "Takeover" by Jay-Z, and "I'm Gon' Cry" by Syleena Johnson 
 "Culture" contains elements from "Soulstar" by Musiq Soulchild, "How High" and "Part II" by Method Man & Redman 
 "Still Getting It" contains elements from "It's Funky Enough" by The D.O.C.
 "Jack Move" contains elements from "Cramp Your Style" by All the People & Robert Moore, "Fantastic Freaks at the Dixie" by Grandwizard Theodore & the Fantastic Five, and "Charlie Murphy vs. Rick James (Part 2)" from Chappelle's Show

Chart history

References

External links 
E.S.P. (Erick Sermon's Perception) at Bandcamp
E.S.P. (Erick Sermon's Perception) at Discogs
E.S.P. (Erick Sermon’s Perception) by Erick Sermon on iTunes

2015 albums
Erick Sermon albums
Caroline Records albums